Andy Mullins (born 1960) is an American voice actor who works for the anime series of Funimation. He provided voices for a number of English-language versions of Japanese anime films.

Filmography

Anime
 Basilisk - Nankoubou Tenkai
 Case Closed - Dirk Copeland, Stanley Evans
 D.Gray-man - Akuma, Cook
 Desert Punk - Additional Voices
 El Cazador de la Bruja - Senator Ritgen
 Fairy Tail - Yajeel
 Fullmetal Alchemist - Father Cornello
 Fullmetal Alchemist: Brotherhood - Father Cornello
 The Galaxy Railways - Heigorō Tōdō, Commander, Additional Voices
 Ghost Hunt - Dr. Oliver Davis
 My Bride Is a Mermaid - Nagasumi's Father
 One Piece - Don Krieg, Wapol, Elizabello II
 Rebuild of Evangelion - Additional Voices
 Speed Grapher - Yumoto
 A Certain Magical Index - Aiwass

Video Games
 Fullmetal Alchemist 2: Curse of the Crimson Elixir - Father Cornello
 The Gunstringer - Additional Voices
 One Piece: Unlimited Adventure'' - Don Krieg

External links
 
 Talent profile of Andy Mullins on SlateCast.com

1960 births
Living people
American male voice actors